William Polk Hardeman (November 4, 1816 – April 8, 1898) was a Confederate States Army brigadier general during the American Civil War. He had fought in the Texas War of Independence in 1836. He was a member of the Texas Rangers and fought in the Mexican-American War in 1846–1847. During the Civil War, he participated in Brigadier General Henry Hopkins Sibley's New Mexico Campaign and in the Red River Campaign. He had a variety of occupations after the war, including superintendent of public buildings and grounds at Austin, Texas.

Early life

William Polk "Gotch" Hardeman was born on November 4, 1816 in Williamson County, Tennessee. He moved to Texas in 1835 and fought in the Texas War of Independence. He joined the Texas Rangers and fought in the Mexican–American War in 1846–1847 under Ben McCulloch, who was later a Confederate Army general.

American Civil War
Hardeman began his Confederate service in May 1861 as a captain of the 4th Texas Cavalry Regiment (sometimes referred to as the 4th Texas Mounted Rifles). In that capacity, he served in Sibley's New Mexico Campaign, including the Confederate victory at the Battle of Valverde and defeat and retreat after the Battle of Glorieta Pass. Lieutenant Colonel William Read Scurry, in command at Valverde, praised Hardeman for leading the last, successful charge of the battle.

Hardeman was promoted to lieutenant colonel of the regiment on March 28, 1862, the date of the Battle of Glorieta Pass, and to colonel in January 1863. In December 1863, he briefly took command of a brigade in the Confederate Trans-Mississippi Department and again commanded a brigade beginning in September 1864. Hardeman led his regiment during the Red River Campaign, including the Battle of Mansfield and the Battle of Pleasant Hill on April 8 and 9, 1864, and during the subsequent pursuit of the retreating Union Army under Major General Nathaniel P. Banks after those battles. Upon the recommendation of Trans-Mississippi Department commander General E. Kirby Smith on October 28, 1864, Hardeman was appointed a brigadier general to rank from March 17, 1865. He commanded a mounted brigade in Texas and Louisiana during the final eight months of the war, until May 1865. No record of his parole has been found.

Aftermath

Hardeman fled to Mexico at the end of the war but soon returned to become a planter in Texas. In 1874 he began to serve as sergeant-at-arms of the Texas House of Representatives and then as inspector of railroads. In the later years of his life, Hardeman was superintendent of public buildings and grounds at Austin, Texas. This job included supervision of the Texas Confederate Soldiers' Home.

William Polk Hardeman died April 8, 1898 at Austin, Texas and is buried in the Texas State Cemetery at Austin.

See also

 List of American Civil War generals (Confederate)

Notes

References
 Boatner, Mark Mayo, III. The Civil War Dictionary. New York: McKay, 1988. . First published New York, McKay, 1959.
 Eicher, John H., and David J. Eicher. Civil War High Commands. Stanford, CA: Stanford University Press, 2001. .
 Schultz, Fred L. "Hardeman, William Polk" in Historical Times Illustrated History of the Civil War, edited by Patricia L. Faust. New York: Harper & Row, 1986. .
 Sifakis, Stewart. Who Was Who in the Civil War. New York: Facts On File, 1988. .
 Warner, Ezra J. Generals in Gray: Lives of the Confederate Commanders. Baton Rouge: Louisiana State University Press, 1959. .

External links
 

1816 births
1898 deaths
Confederate States Army brigadier generals
People of Texas in the American Civil War
People from Williamson County, Tennessee
Military personnel from Tennessee
American military personnel of the Mexican–American War